The Canon PowerShot G5 X is a compact digital camera announced by Canon Inc. on October 13, 2015. It replaced the older G16.

The G5 X  is a new design replacing the optical viewfinder with an electronic one and the 1/1.7" sensor by a one-inch one. The camera has a DSLR-like form factor with the viewfinder in the center.

References

External links 

G5 X
Canon PowerShot G5 X